The Centre for Applied Philosophy, Politics and Ethics (CAPPE) is a research center at the University of Brighton.
The Centre is under the directorship of Bob Brecher and Mark Devenney. It "researches the links between philosophy, critical theory, global ethics, other disciplines and the wider public."

See also
Centre for Applied Philosophy and Public Ethics

References

External links 
Centre for Applied Philosophy, Politics and Ethics home page

Philosophy institutes
University of Brighton
Ethics organizations
Philosophical societies in the United Kingdom
Organizations established in 2005
2005 establishments in the United Kingdom